Per Anders Bäckegren (born 25 July 1968) is a Swedish handball player who competed in the 1992 Summer Olympics. He was a member of the Swedish handball team which won the silver medal. In 1992, he played two matches and scored one goal.

He was born in Gothenburg.

External links
profile

1968 births
Living people
Swedish male handball players
Olympic handball players of Sweden
Handball players at the 1992 Summer Olympics
Olympic silver medalists for Sweden
Olympic medalists in handball
Medalists at the 1992 Summer Olympics
Redbergslids IK players
Handball players from Gothenburg
20th-century Swedish people